The Korean Railway Workers' Union (KRWU), also known as Cheoldo(-)nojo in Korean language, is a labor union of metal workers in South Korea. The KRWU was founded in March 1947 as the Transportation Ministry Association, affiliated with the Federation of Korean Trade Unions.

See also
 2013 railroad strike in South Korea

References

External links
 

Trade unions in South Korea
Trade unions established in 1947
1947 establishments in South Korea
Organizations based in Seoul
International Transport Workers' Federation